The Royal Commission on Capital Punishment was a royal commission on capital punishment in the United Kingdom which worked from 1864 to 1866. It was chaired by Charles Gordon-Lennox, 6th Duke of Richmond. Commissioners disagreed on the question of abolition of capital punishment, but their report's recommendations including abolishing public execution, which was effected by the Capital Punishment Amendment Act 1868.

Appointment
The Government agreed to a Royal Commission on 3 May 1864. In the House of Commons, William Ewart proposed a select committee, but withdrew in favour of Charles Neate's resolution requesting a Royal Commission.

The Commission was formally appointed by Queen Victoria on 8 July 1864. Its terms of reference were:

to inquire into the Provisions and Operation of the Laws now in force in the United Kingdom, under and by virtue of which the Punishment of Death may be inflicted upon persons convicted of certain crimes, and also into the manner in which Capital Sentences are carried into execution, and to report whether any, and if any what alteration is desirable in such Laws, or any of them, or in the manner in which such sentences are carried into execution.

The commissioners were:

Secretary to the Commission was James Henry Patteson

Evidence

The Commission took oral evidence on 15 days, between 29 November 1864 and 25 March 1865, dealing with three or four witnesses a day.

Questionnaire
Written questions were sent by the Commission via the Foreign Office to foreign law officers and experts:
 When a person is found guilty of a capital offence, is there any power in the jury, or the court, to reduce the punishment below that of death by finding attenuating circumstances ? If so, is this power frequently exercised?
If not, to what extent is it mitigated ?
If so, have these crimes increased, and is their increase, if any, attributed to the diminution of the punishment ?
 In what manner is the sentence of death executed, and does the execution take place in public or private ?
 In what proportion of capital convictions is the punishment of death usually reduced by the clemency of the Head of the State to some minor infliction?

Sent France, Belgium, Holland, Prussia, Bavaria, Austria, Saxony, Hanover, Italy, Tuscany, Spain, Portugal, Russia, Switzerland, Denmark, Sweden, Nassau, Anhalt, Oldenberg, Brunswick, New York, Pennsylvania, Massachusetts, Ohio, Maine and Rhode Island, Columbia, Indiana, Venezuela, Wisconsin, Ecuador, the Australian colonies, Scotland, Ireland

Report
The Report of the Commission was published in December 1865. The report proper summarised the evidence and gave the commissioners' recommendations. The oral testimony was printed verbatim over 471 pages; the written responses were gathered into an appendix of 195 pages plus an index. There followed statistical tables and a Draft Bill on infanticide by James Shaw Willes.

In their report, they included a section summarising the response to the following questions:
 the nature of capital punishment; its difference from all other punishments in its irrevocability, etc.
 deterrent effect of the punishment of death
 the Home Office
 restoring to the judges the power of recording sentence of death
 whether juries show a reluctance to convict in capital cases
 the propriety of giving power to jurors to bring in verdicts of "guilty of murder" with "extenuating circumstances" in certain cases
 infanticide
 allowing appeals in capital cases
 whether executions should be public or private
 what secondary punishment should be inflicted in the event of the abolition of the punishment of death

Recommendations
The Commission did not come to agreement on abolition. On most matters, it offered a range of options for legislation. The exception was unanimity of the need for a law to stop public executions and to regulate executions within prisons.

A declaration, drafted by Stephen Lushington, was included in the Report: "[We] . . . are not prepared to agree to the Resolution respecting private executions." Signed by Stephen Lushington, Wm Ewart, Charles Neate, J Moncreiff, John Bright. This is presumably because they strongly favoured abolition.

William Ewart, Stephen Lushington, John Bright and Charles Neate signed a declaration drafted by Ewart: "[we]. . . are of opinion that Capital Punishment might, safely, and with advantage to the community, be at once abolished."

O'Hagan made a longer declaration: "I am of opinion,—with much deference for the great authority of those who think otherwise,—that the weight of evidence and reason is in favour of the abolition of Capital Punishment.

"I should, therefore, sign the declaration prepared by Mr. Ewart, but that I doubt whether public opinion in this country is yet ripe for the acceptance of such a change; and if it should be accomplished, without the sufficient sanction of that opinion, I fear the reaction which might follow on the perpetration of some great crime. I think, also, that the substitution of a minor penalty would render essential serious modifications in the discipline and machinery of our prisons; and such modifications, whilst I believe them to be possible, may be difficult, and remain to be devised. On these grounds, having regard to the practical scope of Your Majesty's Commission, I cannot join in simply advising immediate abolition; but, so far qualifying my adhesion to the terms of the declaration, I am prepared to adopt the principle which it embodies."

See also
Capital punishment in the United Kingdom

References

Sources

Citations

Capital Punishment
Capital punishment in the United Kingdom
Death penalty law
Penology
1860s in the United Kingdom
1864 establishments in the United Kingdom